The 1929 Goodall Cup Final was scheduled to begin on Saturday 10 August 1929, New South Wales had retained the Goodall Cup since 1923 at this point and looked to continue their streak.

The series

Game one
10 August 1929 The first game of the 1929 interstate ice hockey series was described as being a one-sided affair. New South Wales defeated Victoria 4-0, with Norman Turner scoring 2 goals, James Archibald Brown scoring 1 and K. Raith scoring one.

Game two
12 August 1929 at 8:00pm was the beginning of the second game of the series where New South Wales defeated Victoria in a very one-sided match and were described as being too fast for the Victorian team, with K. Raith scoring 3 goals and Jim Brown and Norman Turner also scoring for New South Wales. Victoria only scored twice with B. Cullen and E. Molony providing the goals.

Game three
14 August 1929 Victoria defeated New South Wales by a score of 2-0 but the Goodall Cup was already won by the New South Wales team in the second game.

Teams

Victoria
The Victoria team was made from the following players
 Ted Molony (Forward)(Captain)
 B. Cullen (Forward)
 Davidson (Forward)
 Fox (Forward)
 Kershaw (Defence)
 C.M. Napthine (Defence)
 Donovan (Defence)
 Darke (Goaltender)

New South Wales
The New South Wales team was made from the following players
 Norman Turner (Captain)
 James Archibald Brown
 K. Raith
 A. Raith
 F. White
 J. Barnett
 J. Kerr
 T. Gallecher

See also

 Goodall Cup
 Ice Hockey Australia
Australian Ice Hockey League

References

Goodall Cup
1929 in Australian sport
1929 in ice hockey
Sports competitions in Sydney
1920s in Sydney